Lee Meager (born 18 January 1978) is a British former professional boxer who competed from 2000 to 2008. He held the British lightweight title in 2006 and challenged for the same title in 2008.

Professional career
He had his first professional fight in September 2000, when he beat Peter Buckley on points over four rounds at York Hall, Bethnal Green.

He won 16 of his first 17 fights, drawing the other, before losing on points to Danny Hunt in a fight for the English lightweight title on 19 November 2004.

In May 2006, Meager fought Dave Stewart for the vacant British lightweight title. The fight was at Bethnal Green, and Meager won when the fight was stopped in the sixth.

In December 2006, Meager defended his title against Jonathan Thaxton, at Dagenham. Thaxton won on a unanimous points decision after twelve rounds, to take Meager’s title.

Since losing his title, Meager has had a four-round win against Hungarian, Laszlo Komjathi, and has drawn against Mexican, Jose Alberto Gonzalez in Las Vegas.

Meager fought for the vacant British lightweight title in July 2008 against John Murray, losing in the 5th round when the referee stopped the fight. Afterward, he retired from the ring.

Professional boxing record

See also
 List of British lightweight boxing champions

References

  Fight stats
  Murray beats Meager to win British title

1978 births
Living people
Sportspeople from Salford
English male boxers
Lightweight boxers